Scopaeothrips is a genus of thrips in the family Phlaeothripidae.

Species
 Scopaeothrips bicolor
 Scopaeothrips unicolor

References

Phlaeothripidae
Thrips
Thrips genera